Debenham House (or Peacock House) at 8 Addison Road is a large detached house in the Holland Park district of Kensington and Chelsea, W14. Built in the Arts and Crafts style by the architect Halsey Ricardo, it is a Grade I listed building.

History 
The house was designed in 1905 for department store owner Ernest Ridley Debenham. Debenham had previously lived in another house designed by Ricardo, at 57 Melbury Road in Holland Park. The house only became known as Debenham House after it was sold on Sir Ernest's death.
From 1955 to 1965 the house was used by the London College of Dance and Drama. In the 1990s it housed the headquarters of Richmond Fellowship and was the venue for Royal Garden Parties.

Architecture 
The exterior of Debenham House is Italianate, while the interior style is Arts and Crafts. It is richly coloured everywhere. The main parts of exterior are clad in variegated Royal Doulton Carrara ware with inset panels faced with green and blue Burmantofts bricks. Ricardo was an advocate of ‘structural polychromy’. The glazed materials were also intended to resist the aging effects of the polluted London air. Critic Jonathan Meades has described the house as "structurally stodgy – an alderman dressed as a hippy."

The interior contains tiles designed by William De Morgan, a mosaic dome painted by Gaetano Meo and ceilings painted by Ernest Gimson.

The domed hall, the central interior feature, has a first-floor gallery connecting the upstairs rooms. Decoration throughout the house is extraordinarily lavish. Mosaics depict members of the Debenham family as well as subjects from classical mythology. There are marble and tile fireplaces, stained glass designed by E. S. Prior and mahogany bookcases with Art Nouveau inlays in wood and mother of pearl. The light switches were specially designed and made by the Birmingham Guild of Handicraft.

Filming location 
The interior were featured prominently in Iain Softley's The Wings of the Dove (1997 film).

The exterior of the house was used in the film Secret Ceremony, directed by Joseph Losey. Elizabeth Taylor's character Leonora resided at the house in the film. Debenham House has also featured in the television series What the Butler Saw and Spooks.

The house was used as the filming location of Agatha Christie's Poirot Lord Edgware Dies and Cards on the Table. 

The house also features in the 1949 film Trottie True.

The house features in BBC's Mrs. Bradley Murder Mysteries from 2000 episode 2 'Death at the Opera' Actors include Dame Diana Rigg, Neil Dudgeon dancing tango and David Tennant. Live music is 'Jealousy' and 'Goodnight Vienna' played by Graham Dalby and The Grahamophones with Martin Loveday featured on violin.

References

Bibliography

External links

Houses completed in 1907
Arts and Crafts architecture in England
Halsey Ricardo buildings
Grade I listed houses in London
Houses in Holland Park
Art Nouveau architecture in London
Art Nouveau houses
History of the Royal Borough of Kensington and Chelsea